Xatınbulaq is a village in the Fuzuli District of Azerbaijan.

History 
The village was located in the Armenian-occupied territories surrounding Nagorno-Karabakh, coming under the control of ethnic Armenian forces in August 1993, during the First Nagorno-Karabakh War. The village subsequently became part of the breakaway Republic of Artsakh as part of its Hadrut Province. It was recaptured by Azerbaijan on 4 October 2020, during the 2020 Nagorno-Karabakh war.

References 

 

Populated places in Fuzuli District